Maharajah and the Sepoys, originally called Shatranj Diwana Shah and also known as the Mad King's Game and Maharajah chess, is a popular chess variant with different armies for White and Black. It was first played in the 19th century in India. It is a solved game with a forced win for Black.

Game rules
Black has a full, standard chess army ("sepoys") in the usual position. White is limited to a single piece, the maharajah, which can move as either a queen or as a knight on White's turn (analogous to the amazon fairy chess piece). Black's goal is to checkmate the maharajah, while White's is to checkmate Black's king. There is no promotion.

The asymmetry of the game pits movement flexibility and agility against greater force in numbers. By perfect play, Black always wins in this game, at least on an 8×8 board. According to Hans Bodlaender, "A carefully playing black player should be able to win. However, this is not always easy, and in many cases, when the white 'Maharaja' breaks through the lines of black, he has good chances to win."

Winning strategy

The maharajah can pose a serious threat and even win against a weak opponent. Its strategy is to clean as many black pieces as possible in the early game using forks (attacking more than one unprotected piece at once) as the main tactic; after sufficiently cleaning the board, it should use checks to chase the black king away from its other pieces, drive it to an edge of the board and give checkmate.

Maharajah's critical weakness is that it is royal, so it cannot do exchanges, meaning it cannot capture black pieces that are protected. So the Sepoys' winning tactic is to make moves in such a way that all their pieces stay protected while gradually taking away available squares from the maharajah. 

1... d5 2... Nc6 3... Qd6 4... e5 5... Nf6 6... a5 7... Ra6 8... Rb6 9... Bg4 10... e4 11... Qe5 12... Be7 13... 0-0 14... Rb2 15... Ra8 16... Ra6 17... Rab6 18... R6b3 19... h5 20... g5 21... Nh7 22... Qd4

Now, if the maharajah is on a1, then: 
23... Rb1 24... R3b2 (diagram) 

Else: 
23... Qd1# 0–1

History
Descriptions of this chess variant can be traced as far back as the 12th century in the Mānasollāsa, which refers to the game as sarvatobhadra. It is a variant of chaturanga that is determined by each player throwing two or so dice. Supposedly, the multiple dice were used to expand the rolling player's possible choices. The values on each die correspond to which types of pieces to be moved; the player with the Maharajah is forced to move it like a piece as indicated by the dice.

The chaturanga variant was revived by the 1871 Indian encyclopedia of games Kridakaushalya, which revised it using the moves of modern chess pieces. It was first described in the Western world in 1892 by Edward Falkener, who called it "The Maharajah and the Sepoys".

See also
 Manchu chess

References

Bibliography
 
 

Chess variants
Chess in India
19th-century board games
Solved games